A season-by-season record of Red Star Belgrade's league performances:

1 Goals in all competitions are counted.
2 First title in domestic cup competitions.
3 First title in domestic league competitions.
4 The 1952 season was shortened and sped-up. The reason for the changes was a desire to implement the fall-spring competition format. Competition took place in two phases. In first clubs were divided into two preliminary groups of 6 teams each. Based on their ranking at the end of preliminary groups they were promoted to three groups: Title, Central and Relegation. Each of them containing 4 teams. 
5 Cup competition was not held for 1955–56 and 1974–75 seasons.
6 First season in which club entered European competitions.
7 First final in European competitions.
8 Between 1988–89 and 1991–92, drawn games went to penalties with the winners of the shoot out gaining the point. Figures in brackets represent points won in such shoot outs.
9 First European title.
10 First season of Federal Republic of Yugoslavia's League.
11 Was unable to compete in European competitions due to UN sanctions. 
12 Between 1993–94 and 1995–96 league was divided into 2 groups, A and B, of 10 teams each. In the first half of competition teams played each other twice, and based on number of points won and their position, each team was given certain amount of "bonus points". In the start of spring part of competition 4 last teams from A league were drop to B league, and replaced by top 4 teams from B league. Again teams played each others twice, and in the end final positions were determined by sum of points won at the end of Spring part of competition and bonus points won in the Fall part of competition. 
13 From this season onward for victory was awarded 3 points instead of 2.
14 First season of Serbia and Montenegro's League.
15 First season of Serbian SuperLiga.
16 Managed to qualify for group stage and advance through it for the first time since UEFA Europa League was established in 2009.
17 Managed to qualify for group stage for the first time since UEFA Champions League was established in 1992.

 
Serbian football club seasons
Belgrade-related lists